The men's flyweight event was part of the boxing programme at the 1988 Summer Olympics. The weight class allowed boxers of up to 51 kilograms to compete. The competition was held from 18 September to 2 October 1988. 44 boxers from 44 nations competed. Kim Kwang-sun won the gold medal.

Medalists

Results
The following boxers took part in the event:

First round
 Andy Agosto (PUR) def. Vichairachanon Khadpo (THA), 5:0
 Hamed Halbouni (SYR) def. Johnny Bredahl (DEN), RSC-2
 Timofey Skryabin (URS) def. Zekaria Williams (CIS), 5:0
 Joseph Lawlor (IRL) def. Archibald Fausto (MOZ), KO-2
 Bishnu Bahadur Singh (NEP) def. Sixto Vera (PAR), 5:0
 Arthur Johnson (USA) def. Andrea Mannai (ITA), 5:0
 Nokuthula Tshabangu (ZIM) def. Bonifacio Garcia (ESP), 4:1
 Kim Kwang-Sun (KOR) def. Tseyen-Oidovyn Tserennyam (MGL), RSC-2
 Setsuo Segawa (JPN) def. Simon Morales (COL), 4:1
 Serafim Todorov (BUL) def. David Griman (VEN), 4:1
 Ramazan Gul (TUR) def. John Lyon (GBR), 4:1
 Gamal El-Komy (EGY) def. Amir Hussain (IRQ), 4:1

Second round
 Manoj Pingale (IND) def. Joseph Chongo (ZAM), 5:0
 Mario González (MEX) def. Teboho Mathibeli (LES), 5:0
 Alfred Kotey (GHA) def. Husain Al-Mutairi (KUW), RSC-1
 Benjamin Mwangata (TNZ) def. Peter Ayesu (MLW), 5:0
 Emmanuel Nsubuga (UGA) def. Salem Obeyb (YMD), KO-1
 Benaissa Abed (ALG) def. Aissa Moukrine (MAR), 3:2
 János Váradi (HUN) def. Roberto Jalnaiz (PHI), 4:1
 Andreas Tews (GDR) def. Wang Weipin (CHN), 5:0
 Philippe Desavoye (FRA) def. Anthony Ikegu (KEN), RSC-2
 Melvin de Leon (DOM) def. Badie Ovnteni (NIG), RSC-1
 Andy Agosto (PUR) def. Hamed Halbouni (SYR), 5:0
 Timofey Skryabin (URS) def. Joseph Lawlor (IRL), 5:0
 Arthur Johnson (USA) def. Bishnu Bahadur Singh (NEP), RSC-2
 Kim Kwang-Sun (KOR) def. Nokuthula Tshabangu (ZIM), RSC-2
 Serafim Todorov (BUL) def. Setsuo Segawa (JPN), 5:0
 Gamal El-Komy (EGY) def. Ramazan Gül (TUR), 4:1

Third round
 Mario González (MEX) def. Manoj Pingale (IND), 4:1
 Alfred Kotey (GHA) def. Benjamin Mwangata (TNZ), 5:0
 Benaissa Abed (ALG) def. Emmanuel Nsubuga (UGA), 3:2
 Andreas Tews (GDR) def. János Váradi (HUN), 5:0
 Melvin de Leon (DOM) def. Philippe Desavoye (FRA), 5:0
 Timofey Skryabin (URS) def. Andy Agosto (PUR), 5:0
 Kim Kwang-Sun (KOR) def. Arthur Johnson (USA), 5:0
 Serafim Todorov (BUL) def. Gamal El-Komy (EGY), walk-over

Quarterfinals
 Mario González (MEX) def. Alfred Kotey (GHA), walk-over
 Andreas Tews (GDR) def. Benaissa Abed (ALG), 5:0
 Timofey Skryabin (URS) def. Melvin de Leon (DOM), 3:2
 Kim Kwang-Sun (KOR) def. Serafim Todorov (BUL), 4:1

Semifinals
 Andreas Tews (GDR) def. Mario González (MEX), 5:0
 Kim Kwang-Sun (KOR) def. Timofey Skryabin (URS), 5:0

Final
 Kim Kwang-Sun (KOR) def. Andreas Tews (GDR), 4:1

References

Flyweight